Stefano Giuseppe Menatti (died 5 August 1695) was a Roman Catholic prelate who served as Bishop of Como (1694–1695).

Biography
On 28 October 1686, he was appointed during the papacy of Pope Innocent XI as Titular Bishop of Cyrene. On 3 November 1686, he was consecrated bishop by Galeazzo Marescotti, Cardinal-Priest of Santi Quirico e Giulitta, with Gregorio Carducci, Bishop of Valva e Sulmona, and Pier Antonio Capobianco, Bishop Emeritus of Lacedonia, serving as co-consecrators. On 13 September 1694, he was appointed during the papacy of Pope Innocent XII as Bishop of Como. He served as Bishop of Como until his death on 5 August 1695.

Episcopal succession

References

External links 
 (for Chronology of Bishops) 
 (for Chronology of Bishops) 

17th-century Italian Roman Catholic bishops
Bishops appointed by Pope Innocent XII
1695 deaths